is a Japanese food services company based in Ichinomiya, Aichi.

CoCo ICHIBANYA chain

ICHIBANYA Co., Ltd. owns the top curry rice restaurant chain in Japan, Curry House CoCo ICHIBANYA or usually just CoCo ICHIBAN or CoCo ICHI.  The chain owns both direct and franchise restaurants in a total of eleven countries: United States, Thailand, Indonesia, Singapore, China, Taiwan, Hong Kong, South Korea, Vietnam, the United Kingdom, the Philippines, and Japan and India. The chain used to have an outlet in Malaysia, however, due to lack of popularity and poor business, Ichibanya recently shut down the outlet. The Curry House chain is by far the company's largest business.

 Japan: 1,304 branches

171 International Locations 

China : 46
Taiwan : 24
Hong Kong : 9
South Korea : 36
Thailand : 27
Philippines : 9
United States (Hawaii, California) : 8
Indonesia : 6
Singapore : 4
Malaysia : 1 (now permanently closed)
Vietnam : 2
United Kingdom : 2
India: 2

Halal and vegetarian

The company has a vegetarian menu consisting of plant-based curry and two outlets offering halal option in Akihabara and Shinjuku.

Pasta de Coco

The company also operates 25 restaurants in Japan under the name Pasta de Coco. This dish is one of the distinctive foods of the Nagoya metropolitan area.

References

External links

 CoCo ICHIBANYA's official web site
 CoCo ICHIBANYA USA's official web site

Companies listed on the Tokyo Stock Exchange
Companies based in Aichi Prefecture
Food and drink companies established in 1982
Fast-food chains of Japan
Japanese restaurants
Restaurants in Japan
1982 establishments in Japan